NET Compact Framework controls is a set of controls for .NET Compact Framework.

Overview
The Microsoft .NET Compact Framework is a sub-library of .NET Framework. It simplifies the mobile application development of smart devices. These are to a large extent limited by the screen size, CPU performance or memory capacity. .NET Compact Framework takes some of the controls and libraries from .NET Framework. Moreover, it optimizes them to match the limited options of mobile devices in comparison with PCs.
There are certain criteria of user interface that mobile users demand. While plenty of functions of standard PC or Mac applications add to the user experience, they might decrease the mobile user experience. Mobile screen is usually small. Therefore, the user may often miss click on mobile screen with many buttons. All of the .NET Compact Framework controls are hence optimized to overcome the possible limits of mobile devices. Third-party controls are also available.

Features
 faster UI development
 widely used controls
 source code availability
 possibility to develop applications in Microsoft Visual Studio

.NET Compact Framework controls description

Third-party .NET Compact Framework controls 
Apart from Microsoft other companies exist who produce .NET Compact Framework controls. See External links section below to find out more third-party .NET Compact Framework controls.

References

External links 
 .NET Compact Framework 3.5 Download
 Third-party .NET Compact Framework controls

Compact Framework
Windows CE
Windows Mobile
Computer-related introductions in 2002